David Prever (born ca. 1967) is a four time Sony Award winning radio presenter, and thriller author.

Early life
David was born in London and grew up in Chigwell, Essex. He was educated at Bancroft's School in Woodford Green and attended the Sylvia Young Theatre School, appearing in an episode of The Saint with Ian Ogilvy. He left school at 17 to follow a career in broadcasting.

Radio 
Prever joined Northampton’s Hereward Radio in 1984, before moving to GWR Radio in Bath and Bristol. This was followed by five years in the North East at Newcastle's Metro FM. 
Returning to London, he worked for Jazz FM hosting Saturday nights and then weekend breakfast, before taking over the weekday breakfast show where he won a New York Festival Award. 
Poached by Chrysalis Radio, he joined Heart 106.2 initially on mid-mornings and then the breakfast show with Jon Davis and Kara Noble, winning a Sony Gold Award.
He left Heart to join Magic 105.4 on Drivetime before landing the afternoon show on the relaunched LBC 97.3
Since leaving LBC in 2005, he has worked for Talksport, Smooth Radio and BBC London, Berkshire, Northampton and Three Counties Radio.

On 23 October 2012 it was announced that Prever would become the permanent host of the weekend mid morning show on Smooth Radio, replacing Lynn Parsons who would take over the weekday mid morning slot from December following Mark Goodier's departure from the network. Prever left Smooth Radio in February 2014. Since February 2017 David been presenting breakfast show for BBC Radio Oxford

Business 
In 1991, Prever formed EPM and Lots of Hits Music, with colleague Tim Smith. The record and music publishing formed joint ventures with Universal, PWL and Telstar Records and delivered combined sales of over 10 million units, with 10 worldwide No. 1 singles and albums. Artists on the management roster included Opus III, Undercover and Lindy Layton. Lots of Hits published hits by acts including Tina Turner, Westlife, The Lighthouse Family, Kim Wilde and Mark Owen.

On leaving LBC 97.3 David founded Brandspanking, a branded content and production company winning business from Cadbury, Ocado, HMRC, DSGi, InBev, RBS/Nat West and IKEA. A sister business, Politics on Demand, conceived and produced the first podcasts for Tony Blair and 10 Downing street, as well as the first podcasts for Labour, the Libdems and Conservatives.

Writing 
As a journalist, Prever has contributed articles for The Times, The Guardian and The Express, where he wrote a regular column. 
Signed to the Irene Goodman Literary Agency, he self-published his debut novel, a thriller entitled The Blood Banker, in 2012.

Personal life 
David has two children, an older boy and a girl, with his wife Victoria, a food writer. Both children were born as a result of in vitro fertilisation, a journey they documented in a diary for The Jewish Chronicle. As a result of their experiences, they founded www.multiplymagazine.com a website with news, facts and stories of hope for couples for facing fertility problems.

References

External links

David Prever's Breakfast Club (BBC Radio Oxford)

Living people
English radio presenters
English crime fiction writers
English Jews
People educated at Bancroft's School
1967 births